Dul Golab (also Romanized as Dūl Golāb) is a village in Hendmini Rural District, Hendmini District, Badreh County, Ilam Province, Iran. At the 2006 census, its population was 355, in 69 families. The village is populated by Lurs.

References 

Populated places in Darreh Shahr County
Luri settlements in Ilam Province